Canalicchio is a  of the  of Tremestieri Etneo in the Metropolitan City of Catania, Sicily, southern Italy. It is located very close to the city of Catania.

References 

Frazioni of the Province of Catania